The Centro Cultural Desportivo Minas Argozelo (often simply referred to as Argozelo) is a professional soccer team of Argozelo parish in the city of Bragança, Portugal. The team was found in June 2016. Their official stadium is Estádio Municipal Vimioso. They compete in the professional league Campeonato de Portugal.

Players
Players for C.C.D. Minas de Argozelo include Victor Emilio Parra.

References

Football clubs in Portugal